Victoria (German: Viktoria) is a 1935 German drama film directed by Carl Hoffmann and starring Luise Ullrich, Mathias Wieman and Alfred Abel. It is an adaptation of Knut Hamsun's Victoria. It was made at the Johannisthal Studios of Tobis Film in Berlin. The film's sets were designed by the art director Kurt Herlth and Werner Schlichting. It was shot on location in Bergen in Norway.

Main cast
 Luise Ullrich as Viktoria 
 Mathias Wieman as Johannes 
 Alfred Abel as Der Schloßherr 
 Erna Morena as Die Schloßherrin 
 Helmut Hoffmann as Ditlef 
 Theodor Loos as Der Kammerherr 
 Maria Seidler as Die Kammerherrin 
 Heinz von Cleve as Otto 
 Bernhard Goetzke as Der Müller, Vater Johannes' 
 Margarete Schön as Die Müllerin, Mutter Johannes' 
 Paul Bildt as Professor

References

Bibliography 
 Thomas Elsaesser & Michael Wedel. The BFI companion to German cinema. British Film Institute, 1999.
 Klaus, Ulrich J. Deutsche Tonfilme: Jahrgang 1935. Klaus-Archiv, 1988.

External links 
 

1935 films
Films of Nazi Germany
German drama films
1935 drama films
1930s German-language films
Films directed by Carl Hoffmann
Films based on Norwegian novels
Films based on works by Knut Hamsun
Tobis Film films
German black-and-white films
1930s German films
Films shot at Johannisthal Studios